Freeman E. Franklin (1823/1824 - September 28, 1870) was a state legislator in Mississippi. He served as Speaker of the Mississippi House of Representatives in 1870.

Franklin was from New York. He served in the Union Army in the 34th Ohio Infantry Regiment during the American Civil War rising to the rank of colonel. He fought in battles such as the Kanawha Valley Campaign of 1862, the Wytheville Raid (where he assumed command of a two-regiment force), and the Third Battle of Winchester. In 1863, he commanded a brigade in Scammon's Division of the Department of West Virginia.

After the Civil War, Franklin moved to Yazoo City, Mississippi. He was then elected to represent Yazoo County in the Mississippi House of Representatives in the 1870 session. In that session, he was elected to be the House's Speaker. While still in office, he died on September 28, 1870, near Jackson, Mississippi. In December 1870, Republicans held a nominating committee meeting in Yazoo City to designate a replacement for him after his death before his term expired. He was succeeded as Speaker by H. W. Warren.

See also
Speaker of the Mississippi House of Representatives
Reconstruction era

References

1820s births
Year of birth uncertain
1870 deaths
Speakers of the Mississippi House of Representatives
People from Yazoo City, Mississippi
Union Army colonels
Republican Party members of the Mississippi House of Representatives
19th-century American politicians
People of Ohio in the American Civil War